Medaglie d'Oro could refer to:

Places 
 Medaglie d'Oro (Naples Metro)
 Medaglie d'Oro (Rome), in Municipio XIX
Piazza Medaglie d'Oro, a square in Naples

See also 
 Medaglia d'Oro, the Gold Medal of Military Valour
 Medaglia d'Oro (horse) (foaled April 11, 1999), an American Thoroughbred racehorse